Sabri Lontadila (born June 29, 1992 in Bordeaux) is a French basketball player who plays for French league Pro-A club Limoges.

References

French men's basketball players
1992 births
Sportspeople from Bordeaux
Living people
21st-century French people